Yunodorylus is a genus of ants in the subfamily Dorylinae containing four described species. The genus is distributed widely across mainland Southeast Asia and the island of Borneo.  Yunodorylus was described in 2000, later placed as a junior synonym of Cerapachys by Bolton (2003), and was resurrected as a valid genus by Borowiec (2016)

Species
Yunodorylus doryloides 
Yunodorylus eguchii 
Yunodorylus paradoxus 
Yunodorylus sexspinus

References

Dorylinae
Ant genera